Ryba na suchu is a 1942 Czech comedy film directed by Vladimír Slavínský.

Cast 
 Vlasta Burian - Frantisek Ryba
 Vítězslav Vejražka - Ing. Frantisek Pánek
 Jaroslav Marvan - Jaroslav Horánek, starosta
 Václav Trégl - Tichý, penzista
 Zdeňka Baldová - Starostova zena
 Rudolf Deyl - Professor
  - Vodicka, úcetní
 Helena Bušová - Bozenka, hostinská
 František Filipovský - Rypácek, radní
  - Hoblík, radní

External links
 

1942 films
Czechoslovak comedy films
1942 comedy films
Czech comedy films
Czech black-and-white films
1940s Czech-language films
1940s Czech films